Des Pardes may refer to:

 Des Pardes (1978 film), an Indian Hindi language film
 Des Pardes (1983 film), a Pakistani Punjabi language film
 Des Pardes, a Punjabi language newspaper in Southall, England
 Des Hoyaa Pardes, a 2004 Indian Punjabi language film